The Chapel at the Countess of Chester Hospital is located in Upton-by-Chester, Cheshire, England.  The chapel is recorded in the National Heritage List for England as a designated Grade II listed building.

History

The hospital originated as the County Lunatic Asylum in 1827–29.  In 1865 buildings were added, including a house for the superintendent and a chapel.  The architect was "apparently" T. M. Lockwood. It has subsequently been converted into use as a Spiritual Centre.

Architecture

The chapel is constructed in brick, with ashlar dressings and slate roofs.  Its architectural style is Early English.  Its plan includes a six-bay nave, a single-bay chancel, vestries, and north and south porches.  At the west gable is a bellcote containing a clock.  The east window has three lights, and at the west end is a two-light window.

See also

Listed buildings in Upton-by-Chester
Countess of Chester Hospital

References

Grade II listed churches in Cheshire
Gothic Revival church buildings in England
Gothic Revival architecture in Cheshire
19th-century churches in the United Kingdom
Churches completed in 1864
Churches in Chester